NGC 5331 is a pair of two interacting spiral galaxies in the constellation Virgo. They were discovered by William Herschel on May 13, 1793.

References

External links
 

Spiral galaxies
Interacting galaxies
Virgo (constellation)
5331